Trollstigen (or trollstigvegen) is a serpentine mountain road and pass in Rauma Municipality, Møre og Romsdal county, Norway.

It is part of Norwegian County Road 63 that connects the town of Åndalsnes in Rauma and the village of Valldal in Norddal Municipality. It is a popular tourist attraction due to its steep incline of 10% and eleven hairpin bends up a steep mountainside. During the top tourist season, about 2,500 vehicles pass daily. During the 2012 season, 161,421 vehicles traversed the route, compared to 155,230 vehicles during 2009.

At the  plateau there is a car park and several viewing balconies overlooking the bends and the Stigfossen waterfall. Stigfossen falls  down the mountainside.

Trollstigen is closed during late autumn and winter. A normal operating season stretches from mid-May to October, but may sometimes be shorter or longer due to weather conditions.

Etymology 
Trollstigen means the troll path or troll trail, from the Norwegian stig (also spelled sti), from Old Norse stigr.

History

Trollstigen was opened on 31 July 1936, by King Haakon VII after eight years of construction.

A major tourist facility including a restaurant was completed in 2012. Several viewing platforms have been constructed and older constructions improved upon. Trollstigen (along with County Road 63) was officially opened as a national tourist route by the Minister of Transport and Communications on 16 June 2012. Trollstigen itself (and the alpine summits to the west) lies within the Trollstigen landscape protection area, while the alpine area east of Trollstigen, including the Trolltindene range, is part of Reinheimen National Park.

In June 2021, Telia Norge commissioned an eco-friendly mobile base station powered entirely by solar, wind and hydrogen, therefore providing mobile phone coverage at Trollstigen for the first time ever.

Opening and closing dates

Gallery

See also
 List of highest paved roads in Europe
 List of mountain passes
 List of waterfalls
 Stelvio Pass
 Transfăgărășan

References

External links

See 360° VR panorama of Trollstigen here t
Google Earth view

Geography of Møre og Romsdal
Roads in Møre og Romsdal
Norwegian County Road 63
Rauma, Norway